Lim Chiew Sien (born 14 May 1994) is a Malaysian badminton player. She competed at the 2013 Southeast Asian Games and 2014 Asian Games.

Career
Lim joined the Malaysian national team when she was 16, played as a singles player for six years before switching to doubles in 2016. 

In March 2020, Lim left the national team and started her badminton career as an independent player.

Achievements

BWF International Challenge/Series 
Women's singles

Women's doubles

  BWF International Challenge tournament
  BWF International Series tournament
  BWF Future Series tournament

References

External links 

 

1994 births
Living people
People from Johor
Malaysian female badminton players
Malaysian sportspeople of Chinese descent
Badminton players at the 2014 Asian Games
Asian Games competitors for Malaysia
Competitors at the 2013 Southeast Asian Games
Southeast Asian Games competitors for Malaysia
21st-century Malaysian women